Jerry Bernard Simmons (born November 14, 1942 in Nichols, Florida) is a former American football wide receiver. He played college football at Bethune-Cookman University, and professionally for ten seasons in the National Football League for the Pittsburgh Steelers, the New Orleans Saints, the Atlanta Falcons, the Chicago Bears, and the Denver Broncos.

External links
NFL.com player page

1942 births
Living people
Sportspeople from Bartow, Florida
American football wide receivers
Bethune–Cookman Wildcats football players
Pittsburgh Steelers players
New Orleans Saints players
Atlanta Falcons players
Chicago Bears players
Denver Broncos players
Players of American football from Florida